Ocular hypertension is the presence of elevated fluid pressure inside the eye (intraocular pressure), usually with no optic nerve damage or visual field loss.

For most individuals, the normal range of intraocular pressure is between 10 mmHg and 21 mmHg. Elevated intraocular pressure is an important risk factor for glaucoma. One study found that topical ocular hypotensive medication delays or prevents the onset of primary open-angle glaucoma. Accordingly, most individuals with consistently elevated intraocular pressures of greater than 21mmHg, particularly if they have other risk factors, are treated in an effort to prevent vision loss from glaucoma.

Pathophysiology
The pressure within the eye is maintained by the balance between the fluid that enters the eye through the ciliary body and the fluid that exits the eye through the trabecular meshwork.

Diagnosis
The condition is diagnosed using ocular tonometry and glaucoma evaluation. Increased IOP without glaucomatous changes (in optic disc or visual field) is considered as ocular hypertension.

Treatment

Ocular hypertension is treated with either medications or laser. Medications that lower intraocular pressure work by decreasing aqueous humor production and/or increasing aqueous humor outflow. Laser trabeculoplasty works by increasing outflow.  The cannabinoids found in cannabis sativa and indica (marijuana) have been shown to reduce intraocular pressure, by up to 50% for approximately four to five hours.  But due to the duration of effect, significant side-effect profile, and lack of research proving efficacy,  the American Glaucoma Society issued a position statement in 2009 regarding the use of marijuana as a treatment for glaucoma.

Research 
The LiGHT trial compared the effectiveness of eye drops and selective laser trabeculoplasty for ocular hypertension and open angle glaucoma. Both treatments contributed to a similar quality of life but most people undergoing laser treatment were able to stop using eye drops. Laser trabeculoplasty was also shown to be more cost-effective.

References

External links 

eMedicine - Ocular Hypertension

Glaucoma